Now That's What I Call Music! 44 or Now 44 may refer to two Now That's What I Call Music! series albums, including

Now That's What I Call Music! 44 (UK series)
Now That's What I Call Music! 44 (U.S. series)